The Philippine House Committee on Government Reorganization, or House Government Reorganization Committee is a standing committee of the Philippine House of Representatives.

Jurisdiction 
As prescribed by House Rules, the committee's jurisdiction includes the following:
 Reorganization of the government or any of its branches, departments and instrumentalities, excluding government-owned or controlled corporations
 Creation, abolition or change of the principal functions or nature of any government department, agency, commission or board

Members, 18th Congress

See also 
 House of Representatives of the Philippines
 List of Philippine House of Representatives committees

References

External links 
House of Representatives of the Philippines

Government Reorganization